Leucine-rich alpha-2-glycoprotein 1 is a protein which in humans is encoded by the  gene LRG1.

Function 

The leucine-rich repeat (LRR) family of proteins, including LRG1, have been shown to be involved in protein-protein interaction, signal transduction, and cell adhesion and development. LRG1 is expressed during granulocyte differentiation.  

LRG1 has been shown to be involved in promoting neovascularization (new blood vessel growth) through causing a switch in transforming growth factor beta (TGFbeta) signaling in endothelial cells. LRG1 binds to the accessory receptor endoglin and promotes signaling via the ALK1-Smad1/5/8 pathway.

Application 

Levels of the LRG protein are markedly elevated in acute appendicitis and therefore could be used as a diagnostic aid.

LRG1 may be a potential therapeutic target for the treatment of diseases where there is aberrant neovascularization.

Circulating LRG1 levels are increased in many cancer patients and may be a useful biomarker. Inhibition of LRG1 normalises the tumor vasculature, improves the efficacy of cytotoxic and immune therapies, and restricts metastatic spread. 

LRG1 has been implicated in the pathogenesis of numerous diseases including cancer, eye disease, neurodegenerative disease, diabetes, lung and kidney disease

References

Further reading